Rebin Shah (born 4 October 1988), better known by his stage name Rebstar, is a Swedish recording artist and music entrepreneur. He is the founder and CEO of the entertainment company Today Is Vintage and pro-bono Creative Director for World Childhood Foundation founded by Queen Silvia.

Spearheading Sweden's hip hop export, Rebstar and Today Is Vintage have gained notable international exposure leading the "Swedish invasion".

Early life
Rebin Shah was born in Malmö, Sweden, on 4 October 1988. He is the only child of a Persian mother and a Kurdish father. He found his love for hip hop at an early age, and grew up in Rosengård until his late teens. He learned English in an international elementary school and, after graduating high school, moved to the United Kingdom to study law at the University of Aberdeen. During his short stint in Scotland, he suspended his studies and moved back to Sweden to pursue a career in music.

Music career

2008–2011: Early career
In late 2008, Rebstar released his debut single "Without You", produced by Canadian T-Minus and featuring Trey Songz. "Without You" quickly became a hit and was the third-most requested song on Swedish radio. The success of the single led to Trey Songz coming to Sweden for a promotional tour with Rebstar in December 2008.

In 2008, Rebstar founded 2fresh Records to release his own music. 2fresh served as the label for Rebstar's music and has released singles in collaboration with acts such as Trey Songz, Ray J, Boi-1da and more.

Rebstar's debut mixtape Arrival was released on 4 October 2010. It features Ray J, Trey Songz, Boi-1da, T-Minus, REO, DJ Pain 1. A follow-up mixtape entitled Arrival 2.0 was released on 3 May 2011, including three new songs.

In July 2011, a song by Rebstar entitled "Good Life" featuring Drake and Rock City was leaked and surfaced on multiple blogs.

2012-2013: Bad Karma and Today Is Vintage
In March 2012, he released the mixtape Bad Karma with promotional support from The Pirate Bay and MediaFire. In August 2012, Rebstar featured on Kállay Saunders' single "Tonight". The song peaked at #5 on Hungary's Top 40 Charts with an accompanying music video released on 6 September 2012.

During Autumn 2012, Rebstar announced the founding of a new label, Today Is Vintage. In November 2012, Kállay Saunders became the first signee under Today Is Vintage. In December 2012, Saunders' first single under the label was released, "My Baby".

In August 2013, Rebstar announced a partnership with educational association Studieförbundet Vuxenskolan to form Vintage Initiativet, a non-profit organization for young musicians in Malmö. Rebstar serves as the chairman of the organization and as one of the mentors for children and teenagers interested in music.

On 21 August 2013, Rebstar featured on "Play My Song" by Kállay Saunders, peaking the Hungarian MAHASZ Top 40 Radio Charts at #16, leading to an Eastern-European tour co-headlined by Rebstar and Saunders. The single was followed up with a music video released on 7 October 2013.

2014–2016: You Know Nothing About Love and Girls Like Nicole
On 29 September 2014, Rebstar released "Safe Safe (040 Zlatan Mix)", featuring several prominent rappers from Malmö. The song and music video is a tribute to Swedish footballer Zlatan Ibrahimović, who is also from the same neighborhood as Rebstar, the infamous district Rosengård. "Safe Safe" became an international sensation and Rebstar became a topic of controversy due to the video's exaggerative depiction of Zlatan.

In mid-2014, he began working closely with Gambian recording artist Saint which led to eventually signing him to Today Is Vintage.

On 13 June 2015, Rebstar released his new single "Thing About You" and announced that he is working on a new album, Girls Like Nicole. The single lead to marking Rebstar as the first Swedish rapper in over a decade to be played on American MTV.

In October 2015, Rebstar released yet another single, "Reputation". On 30 November 2015, Rebstar followed up a surprise-release of the EP You Know Nothing About Love, consisting of six songs.

In March 2016, Rebstar revealed to Forbes that his album Girls Like Nicole would be released in the late spring. In June 2016, Rebstar released his album Girls Like Nicole.

2017: The Swedish Invasion and Don't Stress Me
In December 2016, Rebstar discovered and signed LE SINNER whose debut single "Paris" reached #1 on Spotify's Viral Charts in USA and garnering 3 million streams within its first 2 months.

Rebstar's "Don't Stress Me" was released in September 2017, from a new album of the same title.

2019: Rosengård
Rebstar's third album Rosengård was released to mostly favorable reviews in April 2019. The title ("Rose Town" or "Rose Manor" in Swedish) refers to where Shah grew up, an unassuming, blue-collar city that has had a major influx of refugees and immigrants since the late 1990s. The album cover depicts Shah as a toddler, standing in a garden. The album was executive produced by his rumored girlfriend, now his wife as of June 14, 2019, Saturday Night Live writer Megan Callahan.

Business career
Rebstar is the founder and CEO of Today Is Vintage, a record label, music publisher and management firm. In 2018, Rebstar moved to New York City and relocated the company headquarters.

In 2020, Rebstar launched Today Is Vintage Pictures, a film and TV production division with Saturday Night Live writer Megan Callahan-Shah serving as co-founder and co-CEO.

As of 2022, Rebstar has taken an executive role in the company, personally representing Grammy winning producers with songwriters and artists cumulating over 10 billion streams worldwide.

Personal life
Rebstar is married to Saturday Night Live writer Megan Callahan.

Discography

Mixtapes
 Arrival (2010)
 Arrival 2.0 (2011)
 Bad Karma (2012)

EP
 You Know Nothing About Love (2015)
sideWAYS (2018)

Album
 Girls Like Nicole (2016)
 dont stress Me (2017)
 Rosengård (2019)

Singles
 "Without You" feat. Trey Songz (2009)
 "All Night" feat. Kállay Saunders (2013)
 "Safe Safe" (2014)
 "Thing About You" (2015)
 "Reputation" (2015)
 "Haii" (2017)
 "Hello Kitty" feat. LE SINNER (2017)
 "Promises" (2018)
 "EMERGENCY" (2019)
"Somebody Named Frank" (2019)

Collaborations
 “See Me, Hear Me, Feel Me, Touch Me” by Gravitonas feat. Rebstar (2012)
 “Break Me Up” by Gravitonas feat. Rebstar (2012)
 "Tonight" by Kállay Saunders feat. Rebstar (2012)
 "Play My Song" by Kállay Saunders feat. Rebstar (2013)
 “Safe Safe 040 Mix” by Rebstar feat. Saint, Lilleman, Lazee & The C.I.T.Y. (2014)

References

External links
 Official website

1988 births
Living people
Swedish rappers
Swedish hip hop musicians
Swedish songwriters
21st-century Swedish singers
English-language singers from Sweden
Swedish people of Iranian descent
Swedish people of Kurdish descent
Musicians from Malmö
Singers from Malmö